Fredericton-York is a provincial electoral district for the Legislative Assembly of New Brunswick, Canada.  It was first contested in the 2014 general election, having been created in the 2013 redistribution of electoral boundaries from portions of the former districts of Fredericton-Nashwaaksis and York North.

The district includes a band of the City of Fredericton along its northern and northwesternmost edges as well as surrounding parts of York County, including Douglas, Stanley and the Nashwaak River Valley.  It was initially to be named Fredericton-Stanley but its name was revised to Fredericton-York in the Commission's amended final report.

Members of the Legislative Assembly

Election results

References

External links 
Website of the Legislative Assembly of New Brunswick
Map of Fredericton-York riding as of 2018

New Brunswick provincial electoral districts
Politics of Fredericton